Haborym: Book of Angels Volume 16 is an album by the Masada String Trio performing compositions from John Zorn's second Masada book, "The Book of Angels".

Reception

Stef Gijssels stated "Knowing that Zorn composes albums like this one in a few hours, you wonder how much of the music is the result of the musicians' contribution to some sketchy tunes and harmonic directions. Whatever the reality is, the interplay between all three virtusosi is stunning, bringing their incredibly broad bag of musical genres and styles together into a great mixture that can shift as easily from the classical over jazz to folk music and boundary-breaking new music, sometimes all in one track".

Track listing 
All compositions by John Zorn
 "Turel" - 6:20   
 "Tychagara" - 3:39   
 "Carniel" - 4:42   
 "Bat Qol" - 2:55   
 "Gamrial" - 6:40   
 "Elimiel" - 3:04   
 "Techial" - 2:05   
 "Umikol" - 2:30   
 "Malkiel" - 4:23   
 "Raamiel" - 6:24   
 "Gergot" - 3:48

Personnel 
Mark Feldman - violin
Erik Friedlander - cello
Greg Cohen - bass

References 

2010 albums
Albums produced by John Zorn
Tzadik Records albums
Book of Angels albums
Masada String Trio albums